The First United Methodist Church, formerly the Methodist Episcopal Church, South is a historic church in Checotah, Oklahoma. It was built in 1917 and was added to the National Register of Historic Places in 1984.

It is a two-story brick building.  Its sanctuary has an unusual "corner pulpit from which four aisles radiate reminiscent of early 'meetinghouse' styles. It rises two stories with a curved balcony surrounding the rear sides of the sanctuary.  All millwork and furniture are of oak.  The plank floors are white pine."

References

External links

Methodist churches in Oklahoma
Churches on the National Register of Historic Places in Oklahoma
Churches completed in 1917
Buildings and structures in McIntosh County, Oklahoma
National Register of Historic Places in McIntosh County, Oklahoma